Lisy or Lisy Island (Russian - Остров Лисий, means Fox's Island) is a small uninhabited island near the  city of Nakhodka in Nakhodka Bay (Japan Sea).

Lisy Island protects Bay (especially West part of Gulf) from open sea waves.

Lisy is near one kilometre from Nakhodka Oil Port.

Notes

Islands of the Sea of Japan
Islands of Primorsky Krai
Nakhodka
Pacific Coast of Russia
Uninhabited islands of Russia